Leonard Kessler (October 28, 1920 – February 16, 2022) was an American children’s book author. 

Kessler was born in Akron, Ohio and grew up in Pittsburgh, Pennsylvania. He served in the United States Army during World War II and was stationed in Europe. Kessler received his bachelor's degree in fine arts from Carnegie Mellon University in 1949. Kessler moved with his wife and family to New York City, New York and then they moved to New City, New York. Kessler wrote and illustrated books for young readers. He died on February 16, 2022, at the age of 101 at his home in Sarasota, Florida.

Bibliography 

 Adventures With Straw (1967)
 Age Of Aquarius: You And Astrology (1979)
 All Aboard The Train (1964)
 All For Fall (1974)
 Are There Hippos On The Farm? (1987)
 Are There Seals In The Sandbox? (1990)
 Are We Lost, Daddy? (1967)
 Are You Square? (1966)
 The Big Mile Race (1983)
 Binky Brothers And The Fearless Four (1970)
 A Book Of Flying Saucers For You (1973)
 A Book Of Satellites For You (1971)
 A Book Of Stars For You (1967)
 Colossal Fossils: Dinosaur Riddles (1987)
 Cowboys: What Do They Do? (1972)
 Did You Ever Hear A Klunk Say Please? (1967)
 Do Baby Bears Sit In Chairs? (1961)
 Ducks Don't Get Wet (1965)
 The Ellipse (1971)
 The Family Under The Moon (1976)
 The Forgetful Pirate (1974)
 Grandpa Witch And The Magic Doobelator (1981)
 Hello, Aurora (1974)
 Here Comes The Strikeout (1965)
 Homer The Hunter (1972)
 How To Play Better Basketball (1968)
 Is There A Horse In Your House? (1990)
 Is There An Elephant In Your Kitchen? (1987)
 Last One In Is A Rotten Egg (1969)

 Mr. Pine's Storybook (1982)
 Night Story (1981)
 Ocean Wonders (1965)
 Old Turtle's 90 Knock-knocks, Jokes, And Riddles (1991)
 Old Turtle's Baseball Stories (1982)
 Old Turtle's Riddle And Joke Book (1986)
 Old Turtle's Soccer Team (1988)
 Old Turtle's Winter Games (1983)
 The Pirates' Adventure On Spooky Island (1979)
 The Sad Tale Of The Careless Klunks (1965)
 Slush, Slush! (1973)
 Stan The Hot Dog Man (1990)
 Super Bowl (1980)
 The Sweeneys From 9d (1985)
 That's Not Santa (1981)
 Tommy Learns To Drive A Tractor (1958)
 Too Many Rabbits (1974)
 Truck Drivers: What Do They Do? (1967)
 Two, Four, Six, Eight: A Book About Legs (1980)
 What Do They Do? Policemen And Firemen (1962)
 What Do You Play On A Summer Day? (1977)
 What's Inside The Box? (1976)
 What's Up, Doc?: Doctor & Dentist Jokes (1984)
 Who Tossed That Bat? Safety On The Ballfield And Playground (1973)
 The Worm, The Bird, And You; A Long And Short Look At The World About You (1962)
 The Worst Team Ever (1985)

References 

1920 births
2022 deaths
Men centenarians

American centenarians

American children's writers
Writers from Akron, Ohio
Writers from Pittsburgh
Writers from New York City
Military personnel from Pittsburgh
Military personnel from Ohio
Carnegie Mellon University alumni